Andrew Tobias (born April 20, 1947) is an American writer. He has written extensively about investment, as well as politics, insurance, and other topics. He is also known for writing The Best Little Boy in the World, a 1973 memoir – originally pseudonymous – about life as a gay man. From 1999 until 2017, he was treasurer of the Democratic National Committee.

Education
Tobias graduated from Harvard College in 1968 with a BA in Slavic languages and literature. In 1972, he obtained his Master of Business Administration degree from Harvard Business School.

Writing 

While in business school, he wrote for New York Magazine, and after graduation became a contributing editor.

In 1973, Tobias wrote The Best Little Boy in the World, an autobiography in which he spoke of his experiences as a gay boy and young man. He published it under the pen name "John Reid" to avoid the repercussions of being openly gay; the book was republished in 1998 under his real name, to coincide with a sequel, The Best Little Boy in the World Grows Up.

Although he has never held a job in the investment industry, he has written extensively on the subject, including The Only Investment Guide You'll Ever Need, The Only Other Investment Guide You'll Ever Need, My Vast Fortune, Money Angles, The Invisible Bankers: Everything the Insurance Industry Never Wanted You to Know, and The Funny Money Game. He parlayed his writings and advice into success in the software industry with his Andrew Tobias's Managing Your Money financial application.

Tobias books on other topics include Fire and Ice: The Charles Revson/Revlon Story, Getting By on $100,000 a Year, a collection of magazine pieces; Auto Insurance Alert, a book proposing radical insurance reform; Kids Say Don't Smoke on the efforts of tobacco companies to sell cigarettes to younger consumers (which was also published in Russian).

After leaving New York Magazine in 1976, he was a contributing editor to Esquire, then Playboy, Time, and Parade.

Politics 
In 1999, he became treasurer of the Democratic National Committee.

He spearheaded a ballot initiative to convert California's auto insurance system into a no-fault system which would be paid for through a gasoline surcharge instead of premiums. He wrote a book on the topic. He also funded a large part of the campaign himself.

Personal life 
Tobias was the partner of fashion designer and Democratic political activist Charles Nolan, who died on January 30, 2011.<ref>{{cite news |title=Charles Nolan, Designer, Is Dead at 53. |url= https://www.nytimes.com/2011/01/31/fashion/31nolan.html|work=The New York Times |date=January 30, 2011|accessdate=2011-01-21 }}</ref>

Tobias was grand marshal of the 2005 New York City LGBT Pride parade.

He was president and CEO of Harvard Student Agencies in 1967–68 while residing in Winthrop House.

Awards

 1984 Gerald Loeb Award for Magazines for a series on personal finance in Playboy''.

References

External links 

Andrew Tobias' political donations

1947 births
Living people
Harvard College alumni
American finance and investment writers
American male journalists
Journalists from New York City
American gay writers
Horace Mann School alumni
Democratic National Committee people
Harvard Business School alumni
Gerald Loeb Award winners for Magazines
Gay memoirists
21st-century American LGBT people
Democratic National Committee treasurers